Johan Sjöstrand (born 26 February 1987) is a Swedish handballer for Bjerringbro-Silkeborg, and has represented the Swedish national team at several competitions including the 2012 Olympic Games where he was part of the Swedish team that won the silver medal.

References

1987 births
Living people
Swedish male handball players
Handball players at the 2012 Summer Olympics
Olympic handball players of Sweden
Olympic silver medalists for Sweden
Olympic medalists in handball
Medalists at the 2012 Summer Olympics
THW Kiel players
People from Skövde Municipality
Sportspeople from Västra Götaland County